Group D of the 2000 Rugby League World Cup is one of the four groups in the 2000 Rugby League World Cup.

Standings

Matches

Ireland vs Samoa 
The opening match of the World Cup was accompanied by heavy rain. Samoa's Fred Petersen had to be stretchered off the field after suffering a blow to the head while making a tackle 15 minutes into the second half.

Ireland1. Steve Prescott, 2. Brian Carney, 3. Michael Withers, 4. Michael Eagar, 5. Forster, 6. Tommy Martyn, 7. Ryan Sheridan8. O'Connor, 9. Williams, 10. Barrie McDermott, 11. Chris Joynt, 12. Campion, 13. Luke RicketsonSubstitutes: Bretherton, Lawless, Barnhill, Southern. Coach: Steve O'Neill

Samoa1. Loa Milford, 2. Brian Leauma, 3. Anthony Swann, 4. Gulavao, 5. Francis Meli, 6. Simon Geros, 7. Willie Swann8. Puletua, 9. Monty Betham, 10. Seu Seu, 11. Solomona, 12. Fred Petersen, 13. Willie PochingSubstitutes: Tatupu, Kololo, Leafa, Faafili.

Scotland vs Aotearoa Māori 

Scotland: 1. Lee Penny, 2. Matt Daylight, 3. Graham Mackay, 4. Geoff Bell, 5. Lee Gilmour, 6. Andrew Purcell, 7. Richard Horne8. Heckenberg, 9. Danny Russell (Captain), 10. Laughton, 11. Scott Logan, 12. Cram, 13. Adrian Vowles.Substitutes: David Maiden, Matt Crowther, Wayne McDonald, Shaw.Coach: Shaun McRae

New Zealand Māori: 1. Clinton Toopi, 2. Manuell, 3. Kohe-Love, 4. David Kidwell, 5. Sean Hoppe, 6. Gene Ngamu, 7. H. Te Rangi8. Rauhihi, 9. Perenara, 10. Terry Hermansson, 11. Koopu, 12. Tyran Smith, 13. Tawera Nikau.Substitutes: Martin Moana, Leuluai, Nahi, Reihana.

Sin Bin: McDonald (40).
Sin Bin: Nikau (40).

Ireland vs Scotland 

Scotland's loose forward, Adrian Vowles was sent to the sin bin midway through the second half for repeated off-side infringements
Ireland:1. Steve Prescott, 2. Brian Carney, 3. Martyn, 4. Eagar, 5. Herron, 6. Michael Withers, 7. Ryan Sheridan8. O'Connor, 9. Lawless, 10. McDermott, 11. Joynt, 12. Kevin Campion, 13. Luke Ricketson.Substitutes: Williams, Mathiou, Barnhill, Bradbury.

Scotland: 1. Danny Arnold, 2. Matt Daylight, 3. Lee Gilmour, 4. Bell, 5. Matt Crowther, 6. Horne, 7. Scott Rhodes8. Heckenberg, 9. Russell, 10. Laughton, 11. Logan, 12. Cram, 13. Adrian Vowles.Substitutes: Maiden, Graham, McDonald, Shaw.

Samoa vs Aotearoa Māori

Ireland vs Aotearoa Māori

Scotland vs Samoa

References

External links 
 Rugby League Project

2000 Rugby League World Cup